In 1999, the Intelligence Ministry of Iran arrested 13 Iranian Jews, accusing them of spying for Mossad.
Security agents arrested 13 Jewish residents of the Iranian cities of Shiraz and Isfahan, including five merchants, a rabbi, two university professors, three teachers in private Hebrew schools, a kosher butcher and a 16-year-old boy, accusing them of spying for Israel. After a trial in Islamic Revolutionary Court, 10 were sentenced to 4–13 years in prison. The Israeli government and many U.S. Jewish groups and Jewish federations worldwide organized a pressure campaign globally against the Government of Iran, with demonstrations in front of Iranian embassies worldwide.

As a result of the pressure campaigns and secret negotiations, the prisoners were gradually freed in small groups.
The last prisoners were released on February 19, 2003. First news were leaked online on March 18, the news was ignored amid the 2003 Invasion of Iraq. All of them emigrated to Israel and live there with their families. The arrests have later been described as discriminatory in the broader view of antisemitism in Iran.

See also
 History of the Jews in Iran
 Iranian Jews in Israel
 Allahdad
 1910 Shiraz blood libel

References

Jewish Persian and Iranian history
Iran–Israel relations
Shiraz
History of the Islamic Republic of Iran
Antisemitism in Iran
1999 in Iran
1999 in Judaism